Epischnia nervosella is a species of snout moth in the genus Epischnia. It was described by Ragonot in 1887, and is known from Iran and Turkmenistan.

References

Moths described in 1887
Phycitini